Whitfordiodendron is a genus of flowering plants in the legume family, of Fabaceae. It belongs to the subfamily Faboideae. 

Its native range is from Thailand to western and central Malesia (including Borneo, Malaya, the Philippines and Sumatra).

Description
The leaves have 2 to 12 leaflets arranged in pairs plus a terminal leaflet. In W. nieuwenhuisii, the panicles emerge directly from the main trunk; in the other species they are terminal on the branches. It has a yellow or green nectar guide. The keel petals have a short claw. Nine of the stamens are fused together, the other is free; all curve upwards at the apex.

Taxonomy

The genus Whitfordiodendron was established by Adolph Elmer in 1910. The genus name is in honour of Harry Nichols Whitford (1872–1941), an American forester and professor of tropical forestry at Yale University. The Latin suffix of dendron means tree.

It has been treated as a synonym of Callerya; for example,  the genus was not recognized by the United States Department of Agriculture and the Agricultural Research Service. A molecular phylogenetic study in 2019 reaffirmed its status as a separate genus, and the genus was accepted by Plants of the World Online.

Species
It has four accepted species:

References 

Wisterieae
Fabaceae genera